SB2 can refer to :

 Astronomy: a kind of spectroscopic binary star. 
 Aviation: a Russian 1930s bomber, the Tupolev SB.
 Aviation: an American 1930s dive bomber, the Vought SB2U Vindicator.
 Aviation: an American 1940s dive bomber, the Brewster SB2A Buccaneer.
 Aviation: an American 1940s dive bomber, the Curtiss SB2C Helldiver.
 Electronics: the Microsoft Surface Book 2, a high-end personal computing device distinguished by its ability to convert between laptop and tablet form factors. The device was released on November 16, 2017, and was the most powerful device in the Microsoft Surface lineup of personal computers.
 Motorcycles: the Bimota SB2, an Italian motorcycle model, built by the Italian manufacturer Bimota.
 Dragon Ball Z: Super Butoden 2 - A fighting game for Super NES
 Dragon Ball Z: Shin Budokai - Another Road (Known in Europe and Japan as Shin Budokai 2) - A fighting game for PlayStation Portable
 Soldier Boy II, a fictional superhero in the The Boys franchise